This is a list of current bridges and other crossings of the Allegheny River starting from Pittsburgh, Pennsylvania, where it joins the Monongahela to form the Ohio River.

Crossings

Pennsylvania

New York

Pennsylvania

See also
 
 
 
 
 List of crossings of the Ohio River
 List of crossings of the Monongahela River

References

Allegheny
Lists of river crossings in the United States
Allegheney